Dariusz Wolny may refer to:
 Dariusz Wolny (footballer) (born 1969), Polish footballer
 Dariusz Wolny (swimmer) (born 1960), Polish swimmer